The Home-Based Women Worker's Federation (HBWWF) is a trade union federation of home-based female workers in Pakistan. its also a first ever trade union of HBWs in Pakistan. The federation had around 4,500 members in 2019.

Home Based Women Workers Federation (HBWWF) is a unique experience in Pakistan’s informal workers' history. It was registered in 2009 December from National Industrial Relation Commission (NIRC) after getting the registration of three unions in the embroidery and Glass bangle industry. member of the federation are engaged with different sectors like Textile Garment, Shoemaking, toy, and sports goods, Glass Bangles, Traditional Embroidery, Zardozi, Stitching, Cropping, Jewelry, Ralli Work, Hanger making, auto parts making, agricultural sector etc.  

HBWWF is working on four levels
1.	Awareness raising on the issues 
2.	Unionization/organization 
3.	Legislation for HBW
4.	Skill and capacity building training 

The process to organize home-based women workers (HBWW), started in 2005 by conducting study circles with HBWs in different areas of Karachi, Hyderabad, Hub, and Quetta on different issues. We have established cooperatives for HBWW in 2006 in Karachi with garment/textile/embroidery workers and in Hyderabad with glass bangle workers. And in 2016 HBWWF registered its fourth union of HBWs garment and textile workers from Labour Department in Karachi. 

It was a unique and historic moment that first time in Pakistan’s labour history women workers has formed their own unions and federation, which is also headed by all the women.

Organisation & affiliates
The federation organizes meetings for awareness and also trainings in skills like Henna art, embroidery etc. Study circles often involve  discussions on social and economic issues as well as laws for citizens. The Federation also working for the access of HBWs with the old age benefits and worker welfare programs. four Unions affiliated with HBWWF in garment and glass bangle sectors. 

HBWWF itself if affiliated with many organizations at the local and international levels. Internationally, it is affiliated with the World Federation of Trade Unions, the IndustriALL Global Union.

History
In September 2009, Zehra Khan started forming unions in the traditional embroidery sectors. HBWBWU, organising workers in the glass bangle industry, followed in November 2009.

Khan then founded HBWWF on December 30, 2009. It was the first time that women workers formed a national-level federation. Sindh became the first area in South Asia to form legal protection for workers in home-based workers.

HBWWF and its members were successful in achieving the Home-Based Workers Act, passed in May 2018. The act was a historic moment for Pakistan. The act  recognized home-based workers in Sindh as part of the labour force. The act has made it possible to put responsibility on contractors, protecting the labour force involved in home-based industry.

References

Trade unions in Pakistan
Labour relations in Pakistan
2009 establishments in Pakistan
Trade unions established in 2009